Gomido Football Club is a Togolese football club based in Kpalimé. They play in the first division in Togolese football. Their home stadium is Stade Municipal.

Performance in CAF competitions
CAF Cup: 1 appearance
1994 – First Round

West African Club Championship (UFOA Cup): 1 appearance
2009 – Semi-finals (Host)

==Current squad==

References

Football clubs in Togo
1974 establishments in Togo